Timber City Academy (also referred to as "TCA" and formerly called the Butuan Chinese School) is a private Filipino Chinese school in Butuan, Philippines. It currently follows the new K to 12 curricula of the Department of Education. It presently offers pre-school, elementary, junior high school and senior high school education. The school was founded in 1946.

In 2019, Lemuel Dela Cruz Ang, a grade 12 student from Timber City Academy, was awarded as the Best Debater (1st Place) at the 2019th Edition of the World Debate Congress at Osaka, Japan. He became the first and only Filipino to ever win the top award in the competition.

On July 27, 2021, a fire broke out at 9:00pm and a 4th alarm was declared. Bureau of Fire Protection Butuan and Ampayon Stations, Chinese Chambers, and Butuan Rescue Teams responded to the incident. The school building was made of wood. The fire affected the adjacent Prince Hotel, and was in close proximity to Manuel J. Santos Hospital, where COVID-19 and non-COVID patients are held. The incident ended at 11:34pm. Investigations are ongoing.

References

External links
 Official website
 https://news.mb.com.ph/2018/11/22/city-schools-excel-in-talent-competition-in-caraga-region
 https://pia.gov.ph/news/articles/1017248
 http://caraga.popcom.gov.ph/index.php/component/content/featured?start=5
 https://pia.gov.ph/news/articles/1022620
 https://pia.gov.ph/news/articles/1022844

Chinese-language schools in the Philippines
Elementary schools in the Philippines
High schools in the Philippines
Schools in Butuan